Braydon Marvin Manu (born 28 March 1997) is a German professional footballer who plays as a forward for SV Darmstadt 98.

Career
In June 2019, it was announced Manu would join 2. Bundesliga side SV Darmstadt 98 from 3. Liga club Hallescher FC for the 2019–20 season having agreed a contract until 2022.

Manu re-joined Hallescher FC on loan for the rest of the 2020–21 season in January 2021.

Personal life
Born in Germany, Manu is of Ghanaian descent.

References

External links
 
 

1997 births
Living people
Footballers from Hamburg
German footballers
Ghanaian footballers
German sportspeople of Ghanaian descent
Association football forwards
Lüneburger SK Hansa players
Eintracht Braunschweig II players
Hallescher FC players
SV Darmstadt 98 players
2. Bundesliga players
3. Liga players
Regionalliga players